Nedim Omeragić (born 1 February 1999) is a Swiss professional footballer who plays as a forward for the U-21 squad of Swiss club FC Zürich.

Personal life
Born in Switzerland, Omeragić is the brother of footballer Bećir Omeragić and cousin of Edin Omeragic.

Career statistics

Club

Notes

References

1999 births
Living people
Swiss men's footballers
Swiss people of Bosnia and Herzegovina descent
Switzerland youth international footballers
Association football forwards
Swiss Challenge League players
Swiss Promotion League players
Swiss Super League players
Servette FC players
FK Tuzla City players
FC Stade Nyonnais players
FC Zürich players
Footballers from Geneva